The Filmfare Best Supporting Actress Award is given by the Filmfare magazine as part of its annual Filmfare Awards South for Tamil  (Kollywood) films.

The award was introduced and first given at the 50th South Filmfare Awards in 2003, with Sneha being the first recipient.

Superlatives

        
 Saranya Ponvannan holds the record of maximum wins with five awards, followed by Sai Dhanshika with 2 awards.

Winners

Nominations

2000s
2002 Sneha – Unnai Ninaithu
 Devayani – Azhagi
 Easwari Rao – Virumbugiren
2003 Sangeetha – Pithamagan
 Reemma Sen – Dhool
 Sridevi Vijaykumar – Priyamana Thozhi
2004 Mallika – Autograph
 Gopika – Autograph
 Nadhiya – M. Kumaran S/O Mahalakshmi
2005 Saranya Ponvannan – Thavamai Thavamirundhu
 Lakshna – Sivakasi
 Mallika – Thirupaachi
 Saranya Ponvannan – Raam
2006 Saranya Ponvannan – Em Magan
 Bhumika Chawla – Sillunu Oru Kadhal
 Sonia Agarwal – Pudhupettai
2007 Sujatha Sivakumar – Paruthiveeran
 Hemalatha – Kallori
 Swarnamalya – Mozhi
2008 Simran – Vaaranam Aayiram
 Aishwarya – Abhiyum Naanum
 Lakshmi Rai – Dhaam Dhoom
2009 Shammu – Kanchivaram
 Renuka – Ayan
 Sujatha – Pasanga

2010s
2010 Saranya Ponvannan for Thenmerku Paruvakaatru
 Andrea Jeremiah for Aayirathil Oruvan
 Carole Palmer for Madrasapattinam
 Manorama for Singam
 Sangeetha for Manmadan Ambu
2011 Ananya – Engaeyum Eppothum Amala Paul – Deiva Thirumagal
 Lakshmi Rai – Mankatha
 Manisha Koirala – Mappillai
 Mithra Kurian – Kaavalan2012 Saranya Ponvannan – Neerparavai Amy Jackson – Thandavam
 Nandita Das – Neerparavai
 Saranya Ponvannan – Oru Kal Oru Kannadi
 Vidyullekha Raman – Neethane En Ponvasantham2013 – Dhansika – Paradesi Nandita Swetha – Ethir Neechal
 Nazriya Nazim – Raja Rani
 Padmapriya – Thanga Meengal
 Taapsee Pannu – Arrambam2014 – Riythvika – Madras Anaika Soti – Kaaviya Thalaivan
 Kovai Sarala – Aranmanai
 Saranya Ponvannan – Velaiyilla Pattathari
 Seetha – Goli Soda2015 – Raadhika – Thanga Magan Asha Sarath – Papanasam
 Devadarshini – 36 Vayadhinile
 Leela Samson – OK Kanmani
 Parvathy Nair – Yennai Arindhaal2016 – Dhansika – Kabali Aishwarya Rajesh – Dharmadurai
 Anupama Parameswaran – Kodi
 Nithya Menen – 24
 Raadhika – Theri
 Saranya Ponvannan – Kodi2017 – Nithya Menen – Mersal Anjali Varadhan – Aruvi 
 Bhanupriya – Magalir Mattum
 Urvashi – Magalir Mattum 
 Varalaxmi Sarathkumar – Vikram Vedha 2018 – Saranya Ponvannan – Kolamavu Kokila Eswari Rao – Kaala
 Ivana – Naachiyaar
 Priya Bhavani Shankar – Kadaikutty Singam
 Ramya Krishnan – Thaana Serndha Kootam
 Varalaxmi Sarathkumar – Sarkar2020-2021 – Urvashi – Soorarai Pottru' Anupama Kumar – Sarpatta Parambarai Nivedhithaa Sathish – Udanpirappe Raadhika Sarathkumar – Vaanam Kottattum Sanchana Natarajan –  Sarpatta Parambarai Sheela Rajkumar – Mandela 
 Vani Bhojan – Oh My Kadavule''

References

External links
52nd Annual Awards

Supporting Actress